The cuisine of California reflects the diverse culture of California and is influenced largely by Hispanic American roots (Mexican, Latin American, Spanish), alongside East Asian and Oceanian influences (Japanese, Chinese, Filipino, Vietnamese, Thai, Hawaiian), and Western European influences (Italian, French, Portuguese), as well as the food trends and traditions of larger American cuisine.

The main trends were influenced by a combination of Mediterranean climate, geography and geology of the region's proximity to the ocean, its movie roots in Hollywood, its technology roots in Silicon Valley and the Napa wine country, as well as its major produce production. California used to be part of Mexico which influenced the state's food.

Local ingredients
A varied range of micro-climates, dominated by a mild Mediterranean climate, and health-conscious diets and lifestyles in California, promote the production, use and consumption of fresh fruits, vegetables and meats, many of them organic.

In Northern California, with wine country nearby, French, Italian, and Mediterranean inspired food is prominent, as well as Asian-inspired fare. Many of the restaurants, cafes, bistros, and grills use ingredients sourced from local growers and farmers' markets. A unique sourdough-style bread has its origins in San Francisco.

The California coast, especially the North Coast and Central Coast regions, is a source of seafood, which is a staple in the California diet.

California produces almost all of the country's almonds, apricots, dates, figs, kiwi fruit, nectarines, olives, pistachios, prunes, and walnuts. It leads in the production of avocados, grapes, lemons, melons, peaches, plums, and strawberries.

This agricultural diversity of California's Central Valley provides fresh produce in the state. On less than 1 percent of the total farmland in the US, the Central Valley produces 8 percent of the nation's agricultural output by value.

Sunset, a magazine of the West published in California, has featured recipes that have influenced the cuisine of California, including the promotion of outdoor eating.

Sandwiches, burgers, and fast food

Southern California's car culture and the population's reliance on automobiles for transportation throughout California's vast cities, has widely contributed to the popularity of the classic drive-in and modern drive-through restaurants. Restaurant chains such as McDonald's, Jack in the Box, In-N-Out Burger, Carl's Jr., Wienerschnitzel, Del Taco, Taco Bell, Panda Express, Original Tommy's, Fatburger, and Big Boy were all established in Southern California.

Regional fast-food menus differ, generally depending on the ethnic composition of an area.  In Southern California, smaller chains like The Hat feature hamburgers, Mexican food, chili fries, and pastrami.

While gastropubs are not unique to California, the concept of the gourmet burger is very popular.

Latino and Hispanic influences

Because of California's mostly colonial European Spanish roots, Mexican territorial history, and its original population consisting of Meso-Americans, Spanish colonizers and Mexican ranchers, Mexican and Spanish-origin cuisine is very influential and popular in California, particularly Southern California.

Commercial taquería-style Mexican fast food, consisting of offerings such as burritos, refried beans, tortas, tacos, nachos, and quesadillas, is widely popular. Taquerías can be found throughout California.

Traditional Mexican food, while not as common as commercial food, is still widely prepared and abundant in the ethnic Mexican American border communities of San Diego, the Los Angeles metropolitan area, the San Francisco Bay Area, and in Mexican-American enclaves throughout California. Examples of these foods include tamales, tortillas, tostadas, mole, menudo, pozole, sopes, chile relleno and enchiladas.

In addition to Mexican food, California restaurants serve up nearly every variation of Central American food there is. For example, pupuserías are common in areas with a large population of Salvadorans (pupusas are stuffed tortillas from El Salvador).

More recently, "Fresh-Mex" or "Baja-style" Mexican food, which places an emphasis on fresh ingredients and sometimes seafood, inspired by Baja California fare, is highly popular. El Pollo Loco, a fast-food chain that originated in Northern Mexico, is a common sight. Rubio's Fresh Mexican Grill, Baja Fresh, Wahoo's Fish Taco, Chronic Tacos, Chipotle, Qdoba and La Salsa are examples of the Baja-style Mexican-American food trend.

Shellfish and seafood

In Northern California and the Central Coastal region, Dungeness crab is abundant. Sardines and salmon were formerly major industries, before declines in fish stocks. Cioppino (a fish stew) is a classic example of Northern Californian cuisine.

Asian and Oceanian influences
As one of the U.S. states nearest Asia and Oceania, and with long-standing Asian American and Oceanian American populations, the state tends to adopt foods from those national styles. The American style of sushi possibly began in California; the term "California roll" is used to describe sushi with avocado as a primary ingredient. Recently, East Asian confectionery such as mochi ice cream and boba have gained popularity throughout California and the United States, with many establishments that produce them beginning in California.

Fusion cuisine

Fusion cuisine is quite popular in California. The emphasis of California cuisine is on the use of fresh, local ingredients which are often acquired daily at farmers markets. Menus are changed to accommodate the availability of ingredients in season. Some restaurants create a new menu daily.

California chef Wolfgang Puck is known as one of the pioneers of fusion cuisine, popularizing such dishes as Chinese chicken salad at the restaurant Ma Maison in Los Angeles.  His restaurant Chinois in Santa Monica was named after the term attributed to Richard Wing, who in the 1960s combined French and Chinese cooking at the former Imperial Dynasty restaurant in Hanford, California.

California-style pizza

California-style pizza focuses on non-traditional pizza ingredients, such as fresh produce and barbecued meats. First popularized by Wolfgang Puck's Spago restaurants, it was later brought to the masses by restaurants such as California Pizza Kitchen.

Barbecue 

Barbecue has been a part of California cuisine since Mexicans cooked beef in pit barbecues on ranches since the 1840s. Santa Maria, California, is famous for the tri-tip, a special kind of beef cut that can be grilled, baked, braised, or roasted.

California's barbecue style is also influenced by the styles of Arizona, New Mexico, Texas, and Oklahoma, brought by Dust Bowl migrants. Chicken, beef ribs, sausages, and steaks are also grilled or smoked in a barbecue pit.

The barbecue sauce used in this state is tomato-based, as with all other western states. Santa Maria barbecue, however, uses no sauce, relying instead on the flavor of the tri-tip and the slow live-oak fire over which it is cooked.

Pork baby back ribs are popular for barbecue in the Western region in comparison to the popular use of spare ribs in the United States.

Gourmet food products

Many gourmet food products and companies had their start in California, including Peet's Coffee & Tea.

References

External links

California culture
California
California
Cuisine of the Southwestern United States